Egri FC is a Hungarian football club, based in Eger. The club's colours are red and blue. They played five times in the first league, however there were two years in the recent past (2003–05) when the city of Eger had no adult football team. The team was refounded in 2005 and they played in lower divisions.

In 2011, the club won the Nemzeti Bajnokság III, so in the 2011–12 season they play in the second league. In 2011–2012 Eger won the Nemzeti Bajnokság II so they promoted to the first league.

Ownership
In 2013, 75% of the shares of the club were bought by John P. Marshall.

Managers
 Antal Simon (June 2011 – Feb 13)
 Ferenc Mészáros (March 2013 – May 13)
 Csaba Vojtekovszki (May 2013–)

External links
 Egri FC fan site 

Football clubs in Hungary
2005 establishments in Hungary